Studeny Kolodets is a rural locality (a selo) in Alexeyevsky District, Belgorod Oblast, Russia. The population was 211 as of 2010. There are 2 streets.

Geography 
Studeny Kolodets is located 27 km northeast of Alexeyevka (the district's administrative centre) by road. Repenka is the nearest rural locality.

References 

Rural localities in Alexeyevsky District, Belgorod Oblast
Biryuchensky Uyezd